Dockey Tarn is a small lake in South Lakeland district, Cumbria, England. It has been said to be one of the smallest tarns in the Lake District which is named on Ordnance Survey maps; it does not appear on their maps at 1:50,000 scale but is marked and named on their 1:25,000 maps.

A visitor in 2018 reported that the tarn had at that time dried up completely.

The name of the tarn appeared in a 1749 document spelled "Dockrey Tarn", and is believed to derive from the local family surname Dockray.

References 

Lakes of the Lake District
South Lakeland District